Zhang Penghui (born January 9, 1978, in Changzhou, Jiangsu) is a male Chinese sports shooter. He won the 2006 ISSF World Shooting Championships in 25 metre rapid fire pistol.

In the 2004 Summer Olympics, he finished seventh in the men's 25 metre rapid fire pistol competition. Four years later he competed, as the reigning World champion, on home soil in the 2008 Summer Olympics, but was disqualified during the second stage of the rapid fire pistol competition, for repeatedly violating the 45 degree rule, the rapid fire equivalent of a false start.

External links
 profile

1978 births
Living people
Chinese male sport shooters
ISSF pistol shooters
Olympic shooters of China
Sportspeople from Changzhou
Shooters at the 2004 Summer Olympics
Shooters at the 2008 Summer Olympics
Asian Games medalists in shooting
Sport shooters from Jiangsu
Shooters at the 1998 Asian Games
Shooters at the 2006 Asian Games
Asian Games gold medalists for China
Asian Games silver medalists for China
Asian Games bronze medalists for China
Medalists at the 1998 Asian Games
Medalists at the 2006 Asian Games
21st-century Chinese people